Murexsul chesleri is a species of sea snail, a marine gastropod mollusk in the family Muricidae, the murex snails or rock snails.

Description

Distribution
This marine species occurs off Honduras.

References

 Houart, R., 2006 Description of two new species of Muricidae from Martinique and Honduras and re-evaluation of Muricopsis s.s. in the western Atlantic- Novapex, vol. 7(2-3), pp. 47–53

Muricidae
Gastropods described in 2006